Persea macrantha, the large-flowered bay tree, is an evergreen tree in the laurel family (Lauraceae), native to southwestern India and Sri Lanka.

The tree grows in the Western Ghats mountain range of India, and can reach . Leaves are simple, alternate, spiral; lamina obovate or elliptic to elliptic-oblong; apex rounded or acuminate or acute; base acute to rounded with entire margin. Flowers show terminal panicle inflorescence. Fruit is a berry  which becomes blackish on ripening.

The plant is known to have medicinal properties and used in Ayurveda.

Common names
 Kannada - chittu thandri, gulamaavu, gulimaavu 
 Malayalam - kulamavu, ooravu 
 Marathi - gulaamba 
 Tamil - iruli, kolamavu, kolarmavu 
 Telugu - naara

References

External links

macrantha
Flora of India (region)
Flora of Sri Lanka